, originally , is one of fourteen autonomous branches of the Rinzai school of Japanese Zen, founded in 1300 by the monk Jiun Myoi in Toyama, Japan. In 1327 Emperor Go-Daigo gave the temple the name Kokutai-ji, and Jiun Myoi became Seisen Zenji.

Kokutai-ji was once also a temple of the Fuke sect (as many Rinzai monasteries in Japan once were), and housed komusō. Rinzai monks and priests still dress and practice suizen as komusō during memorial ceremonies in remembrance of Jiun Myoi.

See also
Buddhism in Japan
 For an explanation of terms concerning Japanese Buddhism, Japanese Buddhist art, and Japanese Buddhist temple architecture, see the Glossary of Japanese Buddhism.

Notes

References

Buddhist temples in Japan
 
Buddhist temples in Toyama Prefecture